This is a list of states in the Holy Roman Empire beginning with the letter L:

References

L